In telecommunication, a mesochronous network is a network in which the clocks run with the same frequency but unknown phases.  Compare synchronous network.

See also
Synchronization in telecommunications
Isochronous signal
Plesiochronous system
Asynchronous system

Network architecture
Synchronization